3D Realms Entertainment ApS is a video game publisher based in Aalborg, Denmark. Scott Miller founded the company in his parents' home in Garland, Texas, in 1987 as Apogee Software Productions to release his game Kingdom of Kroz. In the late 1980s and early 1990s, the company popularized a distribution model where each game consists of three episodes, with the first given away free as shareware and the other two available for purchase. Duke Nukem was a major franchise created by Apogee to use this model, and Apogee published Commander Keen and Wolfenstein 3D the same way.

Apogee adopted the trading name 3D Realms in 1996; the "Apogee Software" name and logo were sold to Terry Nagy in 2008, using which he established Apogee Entertainment. While Apogee focused on 2D platform games and puzzle games, 3D Realms produced fully 3D games and went away from shareware distribution.

Following two extensively delayed games, Prey and Duke Nukem Forever, 3D Realms laid off significant portions of its staff and underwent a corporate restructure, retaining only production and publishing roles thereafter. In March 2014, the company was acquired by SDN Invest, a Danish holding company and part-owner of Interceptor Entertainment, and relocated to Denmark by December 2014. Miller remains an advisor for the company. In August 2021, the company was acquired by Embracer Group subsidiary Saber Interactive.

History

Background 
In the early 1980s, Scott Miller often spent time in the computer lab of the high school he was attending, programming text adventures on the facility's Apple II and getting to know fellow student George Broussard. Following graduation, both of them took jobs at local amusement arcade The Twilight Zone, allowing Miller to attend college and increase his interest in video games at the same time. Following his sophomore year, Miller dropped out of the University of Dallas to focus entirely on video games, including participating in tournaments as well as programming his own games. At that time, he found a special interest in the Turbo Pascal programming language and its easy integration on IBM Personal Computers. Miller subsequently figured that his knowledge on video games should earn him more money than he made at The Twilight Zone, wherefore he, with assistance by Broussard, wrote a manual-style book on "how to beat video games". The book fell into obscurity due to an oversaturated market but landed Miller a job as a video game critic for The Dallas Morning News and minor game-centric papers. After four years of writing for the newspaper, he decided that he was capable of creating games that were better than those that he had to review and quit his job. Miller acquired a 16.5k modem, which he installed in his parents' house in Garland, Texas and started operating as a full-time independent game developer.

The Apogee Model (1987–1996) 

Most games developed by Miller at the time used extended ASCII characters as graphics. The format appeared popular to him but ultimately proved unsuccessful when pitching them to publishers, adding to him not having a college degree or any professional experience in game development. As such, he considered self-printing copies of his games, or distributing them freely through bulletin board systems (BBS), where the boards' users make voluntary donations, a model known as shareware distribution. As the prior option seemed too expensive to Miller, he had to choose the latter, despite being urged not to by friends and colleagues. Miller released Beyond the Titanic and Supernova as shareware games in 1986 and 1987, respectively, but income was low, at roughly  donated in a year for both games combined. Miller's next game, Kingdom of Kroz, was developed to include 60 levels, more than what he wanted to release to the public for no cost. As such, he developed a new distribution model, dubbed the "Apogee model", in which only a fraction of the game would be made available to play for free on BBS, which, upon completion, would display Miller's mailing address to the player and ask them to contact him to buy the rest of the game. He applied this model to Kingdom of Kroz by breaking it up into three parts, named episodes, and sharing the first one over BBS while retaining the other two for sale. Released on November 26, 1987, Kingdom of Kroz was the first game to bear the name of Miller's one-man company, Apogee Software Productions. Broussard later joined Apogee, merging his own, lesser-known game company Micro-FX into it.

3D Realms (1996–2009) 
With the original intent to create a division for every genre of game Apogee produced, the two brand names 3D Realms (formed in July 1994) and the now disused Pinball Wizards were created. Instead of publishing every game under Apogee as it had been in the past, the goal of this strategy was to create a different brand for each game genre, making each new game identifiable based on which brand it belonged to. This enabled Apogee to target different markets.

However, many of those varied genres such as platform or scrolling shooter (that were much of Apogee's early releases) were slowly dying out in the late 1990s, which made this strategy unnecessary. In addition, due to the increasingly lengthy development time in producing a game title, video game publishers were no longer releasing titles at the rapid rate at which they once were.

3D Realms was created in 1994 for the 3D game Terminal Velocity and was responsible for the latest installments of the successful Duke Nukem games and for producing the Max Payne series (earlier 3D games like Rise of the Triad were released under the Apogee name). The Pinball Wizards name was created for the 1997 pinball title Balls of Steel, but has not been used since.

The last game to be published under the Apogee name was Stargunner in 1996. Since 1998, all the company's games have been using a 3D engine (even if the gameplay is 2D, like in Duke Nukem: Manhattan Project). As a result, 3D Realms has replaced Apogee as the brand name to publish games under. 

The Apogee name was spun off as Apogee Software, LLC, now Apogee Entertainment, in 2008 as a separate company that would handle distribution, remakes, and other developments related to older Apogee games.

Corporate restructuring, legal disputes (2009–2014) 
Prey was released by 3D Realms on July 11, 2006, after being in development hell for eleven years. Prey was originally developed internally by 3D Realms, but after several years of delays, the company outsourced the development to Human Head Studios.

The other major project that 3D Realms was working on was Duke Nukem Forever, the sequel to Duke Nukem 3D. It was announced in 1997, and on May 6, 2009, its development was halted due to the development team being let go. According to Miller, the development was using up much of the company's funds as they struggled to bring in new 3D rendering technology for Duke Nukem Forever, leading to the decision to cut their staff and sell the company The release date of the game was "when it's done." During the years of the development of the game, some outside developers have developed and published Duke Nukem spin-offs.

On May 6, 2009, due to lack of funding, major staff cuts were initiated with the entire development team being laid off and other employees being given notice of their employment with the company being terminated. The company website briefly went offline on that day, but went back up soon afterwards. While there was no statement at that moment on the closure, apart from messages on the 3D Realms forum, a message appeared in the front page of the site, showing a group photo of the 3D Realms team, with the caption "Goodbye. Thanks for being fans and for all your support."

It was reported on May 14, 2009 that Take-Two, holders of the publishing rights of Duke Nukem Forever, filed a breach of contract suit against Apogee Software Ltd (3D Realms) over failing to deliver the aforementioned title. Take-Two Interactive asked for a restraining order and a preliminary injunction, to make 3D Realms keep the Duke Nukem Forever assets intact during proceedings.

On May 18, 2009, 3D Realms key executives released the first full "press release" with their side of the developments. "3D Realms has not closed and is not closing. [...] Due to lack of funding, however, we are saddened to confirm that we let the Duke Nukem Forever development team go on May 6 [...] While [3D Realms] is a much smaller studio now, we will continue to operate as a company and continue to license and co-create games based upon the Duke Nukem franchise. [...] Take-Two's proposal was unacceptable to [3D Realms] for many reasons, including no upfront money, no guarantee minimum payment, and no guarantee to complete [Duke Nukem Forever]. [...] We viewed Take-Two as trying to acquire the Duke Nukem franchise in a "fire sale." [...] We believe Take-Two's lawsuit is without merit and merely a bully tactic to obtain ownership of the Duke Nukem franchise. We will vigorously defend ourselves against this publisher."

On September 3, 2010, Take-Two Interactive announced that development of Duke Nukem Forever had been shifted over to Gearbox Software, effectively ending 3D Realms' association with the game after 12 years of stunted development. 3D Realms remained a co-developer on Duke Nukem Forever, due to their involvement in developing most of the game. However, the rights and intellectual property were sold to Gearbox, who became the owners of the Duke Nukem franchise. 3D Realms retained certain rights to the Duke Nukem back catalogue, but transferred all rights to Gearbox Software in 2015.

An external developer, Interceptor Entertainment, started work on a fan-project remake of Duke Nukem 3D in 2010. They received a limited authorization from Gearbox to proceed with the game, which was named Duke Nukem 3D: Reloaded. However, after Duke Nukem Forevers release and negative reception in 2011, Duke Nukem 3D: Reloaded was put on hold indefinitely.

In an interview conducted with Scott Miller in April 2011, Miller specified that 3D Realms was involved with several projects citing, "Yes, we have several projects underway, all fairly small—not any big console games. Once [Duke Nukem Forever] comes out we'll be definitely looking to invest into other projects, and maybe other  teams who are blazing new trails on smaller platforms, like smart phones and XBLA. We have a long history of investing in young, unproven teams, going way back to Id Software, and including other notables like Parallax Software (we were the first studio to invest in Descent), and Remedy Entertainment (Death Rally and Max Payne). So, we like that model and will keep doing it in the future. We seem to have a good eye for unproven talent waiting for some experienced guidance and hard-to-find funding."

In June 2013, 3D Realms sued Gearbox for unpaid royalties as well as unpaid money for selling the Duke Nukem intellectual property. The lawsuit was dropped in September 2013 with 3D Realms apologizing with an announcement that they had resolved any differences they had with Gearbox.

3D Realms has since sold the rights of some of its older titles, leading to several remakes. One of them, Rise of the Triad, was developed by Interceptor Entertainment and published in 2013 by Apogee Software, LLC. Another remake, Shadow Warrior, was developed by Flying Wild Hog and published by Devolver Digital in 2013.

In February 2014, Gearbox sued 3D Realms, Interceptor Entertainment and Apogee Software for developing a new game called Duke Nukem: Mass Destruction. Gearbox stated that it was still the rights holder of the Duke Nukem franchise, and permission had not been granted by them to develop the game. 3D Realms soon after released a statement admitting its wrongdoing. The lawsuit was settled in August 2015, with Gearbox stressing that it was still the lawful owner of the Duke Nukem intellectual property.

New ownership (2014–2021) 

On March 2, 2014, it was announced that SDN Invest, the part-owner of Interceptor Entertainment, had acquired 3D Realms for an undisclosed sum. Mike Nielsen, the founder and chairman of SDN Invest, became the new chief executive officer of 3D Realms. That December, 3D Realms relocated its headquarters to Aalborg, Denmark.

In May 2014, 3D Realms revealed they were working on a new game called Bombshell. The game was released on January 29, 2016.

In 2017, 3D Realms announced a return to development with a ZOOM Platform partnership for Shadow Stalkers, which was expected to come out in 2018 for PlayStation 4, PC, Mac, and Linux platforms. Bernie Stolar and Jordan Freeman of ZOOM Platform, Scott Miller of 3D Realms, and actor Pierce Brosnan have been linked to the project. No releases have been made, as of yet. However, voice recording footage and pictures, have been released by Freeman and ZOOM Platform. The aforementioned footage and pictures include actors and comedians Andy Dick, Bruce Dern, Christian Erickson, Rich Vos and singer Sebastian Bach. Release appears set for 2020 with no 3D Realms involvement.

On February 28, 2018, 3D Realms announced the game Ion Maiden, a prequel to Bombshell, developed by Voidpoint and using Ken Silverman's Build Engine. In May 2019, the company was hit with a $2 million trademark infringement lawsuit by heavy metal group Iron Maiden who claimed Ion Maiden was "nearly identical to the Iron Maiden trademark in appearance, sound and overall commercial impression" and was "attempting to trade off on Iron Maiden’s notoriety." The company said it would "review its options once we receive official notice of the lawsuit and will make any necessary decisions at the appropriate time." In July 2019, 3D Realms and Voidpoint changed the name of Ion Maiden to Ion Fury, in order to put an end to the lawsuit. Ion Fury was released on August 15, 2019.

3D Realms announced Graven as a spiritual successor to Hexen II in September 2020, to be released on major consoles and computers in 2021.

Acquisition by Embracer Group (2021–present) 

In August 2021, Embracer Group announced that they acquired the company through Saber Interactive, which will be the parent company.

Games

References

External links 
 

Companies based in Garland, Texas
Video game companies established in 1987
1987 establishments in Texas
Video game companies of the United States
Video game companies of Denmark
Video game development companies
Video game publishers
2014 mergers and acquisitions
2021 mergers and acquisitions
Companies based in Aalborg
Saber Interactive